King George V-class battleship may refer to:

 King George V-class battleship (1911), a class of four Royal Navy battleships that served in World War I
 King George V-class battleship (1939), a class of five Royal Navy battleships that served in World War II